Bythiospeum sandbergeri is a species of very small freshwater snails that have an operculum, aquatic gastropod mollusks in the family Hydrobiidae.

This species is endemic to Germany.

References

Hydrobiidae
Bythiospeum
Endemic fauna of Germany
Gastropods described in 1886
Taxonomy articles created by Polbot